In Greek mythology, Amphissa (Ancient Greek: Ἄμφισσα) or simply, Issa (Ἴσσα) was the daughter of Macareus and a lover of Apollo. She was the eponym of the city Amphissa in Ozolian Locris, where her memory was perpetuated by a splendid monument.

Mythology 
One may assume that Amphissa was the child conceived in the incestuous relationship between Macareus and his sister Canace, but it appears from Ovid that the child was male, and that it was torn apart by wild beasts upon being exposed by Aeolus.

Amphissa is likely the same as "Isse Macareïs" (i. e. Isse the daughter of Macareus) mentioned by Ovid as a lover of Apollo who initially seduced her in the disguise of a shepherd. Their story was one of the images Arachne wove into her weaving, along with other disguises that Apollo, Zeus, Poseidon and Dionysus used when seducing mortal women and nymphs.

Hyginus makes mention of Euboea, a daughter of a Macareus and the mother of Agreus by Apollo; this may or may not be an alternate version of Amphissa's story.

Notes

References 

 Gaius Julius Hyginus, Fabulae from The Myths of Hyginus translated and edited by Mary Grant. University of Kansas Publications in Humanistic Studies. Online version at the Topos Text Project.
 Pausanias, Description of Greece with an English Translation by W.H.S. Jones, Litt.D., and H.A. Ormerod, M.A., in 4 Volumes. Cambridge, MA, Harvard University Press; London, William Heinemann Ltd. 1918. . Online version at the Perseus Digital Library
Pausanias, Graeciae Descriptio. 3 vols. Leipzig, Teubner. 1903.  Greek text available at the Perseus Digital Library.
 Publius Ovidius Naso, Metamorphoses translated by Brookes More (1859-1942). Boston, Cornhill Publishing Co. 1922. Online version at the Perseus Digital Library.
 Publius Ovidius Naso, Metamorphoses. Hugo Magnus. Gotha (Germany). Friedr. Andr. Perthes. 1892. Latin text available at the Perseus Digital Library.
 Publius Ovidius Naso, The Epistles of Ovid. London. J. Nunn, Great-Queen-Street; R. Priestly, 143, High-Holborn; R. Lea, Greek-Street, Soho; and J. Rodwell, New-Bond-Street. 1813. Online version at the Perseus Digital Library.
Stephanus of Byzantium, Stephani Byzantii Ethnicorum quae supersunt, edited by August Meineike (1790-1870), published 1849. A few entries from this important ancient handbook of place names have been translated by Brady Kiesling. Online version at the Topos Text Project.

External links 

 Amphissa (Isse) at Greek Mythological Link

Princesses in Greek mythology
Aeolides
Women of Apollo